Ortwin Rodewald is a rower from East Germany who competed for the SG Dynamo Potsdam / Sportvereinigung (SV) Dynamo.

Rodewald won medals at World Rowing Championships. He went to the 1978 World Rowing Championships on Lake Karapiro in New Zealand as a reserve but did not compete.

References 

Living people
Year of birth missing (living people)
East German male rowers
World Rowing Championships medalists for East Germany